Cymothoe sangaris, the blood-red glider, is a species of butterfly of the family Nymphalidae. It is found in Central Africa.

Some authors believe the species should be split into separate species. They base this on morphological characteristics (mainly in the females) and DNA research. The new species would be specialised in one food plant.

Currently, the following subspecies are recognised:
Cymothoe sangaris sangaris 
Range: Guinea, Sierra Leone, Liberia, Ivory Coast, Ghana, Nigeria, Cameroon, Congo, Angola, DRC: Ubangi, Mongala, Uele, North Kivu, Tshopo, Tshuapa, Equateur, Kinshasa, Kwango, Kasai, Sankuru and Maniema provinces
Cymothoe sangaris luluana Overlaet, 1945
Range: DRC: Lualaba and Lomami provinces, Zambia

The larvae feed on Rinorea species.

References

Butterflies described in 1824
Cymothoe (butterfly)